Gunner Olesen (22 December 1916 – 24 February 1979) was a Danish gymnast. He competed in eight events at the 1948 Summer Olympics.

References

External links
 

1916 births
1979 deaths
Danish male artistic gymnasts
Olympic gymnasts of Denmark
Gymnasts at the 1948 Summer Olympics
People from Slagelse
Sportspeople from Region Zealand